"Welcome to the Pleasuredome" is the title track to the 1984 debut album by British band Frankie Goes to Hollywood. The lyrics of the song were inspired by the poem Kubla Khan by Samuel Taylor Coleridge.

In March 1985, the album track was abridged and remixed for release as the group's fourth UK single.

While criticised at the time of release and afterward for being a song that glorifies debauchery, the lyrics (and video), just as Coleridge's poem, were about the dangers of mindless indulgence. This song, along with "Relax", made Frankie Goes to Hollywood even more controversial than they already were.

Billboard compared it to "Relax," saying that "Welcome to the Pleasuredome" had "less hook, less controversy, more drama."

Original 1985 single
Despite the group's record label (ZTT) pre-emptively promoting the single as "their fourth number one", an achievement that would have set a new UK record for consecutive number one singles by a debuting artist, "Welcome to the Pleasuredome" peaked at number two on the UK Singles Chart, being kept off the top spot by the Phil Collins/Philip Bailey duet "Easy Lover". The single spent a total of eleven weeks on the UK chart.

It was the first release by the group not to reach number one and, despite representing a creditable success in its own right, it symbolically confirmed the end of the chart invincibility that the group had enjoyed during 1984. Frankie Goes to Hollywood would not release another record for seventeen months, and they would fail to emulate their past chart success upon their return.

The spoken-word introductions to both 12-inch mixes are adapted from Walter Kaufmann's 1967 translation of Friedrich Nietzsche's The Birth of Tragedy. The recitation on the first 12-inch ("Real Altered") is by Gary Taylor, whilst that on the second 12-inch ("Fruitness") and the cassette is by actor Geoffrey Palmer. It is unknown whether Palmer's concluding "Welcome To The Pleasuredrome" was a genuine mistake or a deliberately scripted one.

This is the only single from the group that was not released on a CD single at that time. "Relax", "Two Tribes", "The Power of Love" and "Rage Hard+" all saw a CD-maxi release in Germany at the end of the '80s.  "Welcome to the Pleasuredome" was not given such a release. However, the 7" vinyl single was released in two different mixes, and it was purely random as to which one you ended up with, as both mixes were in identical sleeve designs and carried the same catalogue number. Not only that, but the subtitle used to identify different mixes was identical on both record labels, with only the matrix number on the run out groove giving the game away. The first 7" (matrix 7 A 1 U) carried the normal 7" single mix, which was guitar driven. However, the "secret" alternative mix (matrix 7 A 7 U or 7 A 8 U) was quite different, and featured on the Apple shaped Picture Disc. The subtitle for that disc was 'alternative reel' but on the 7" single the subtitle remained unchanged as 'altered real'. 
In fact, although appearing to be identical sleeves, the two mixes were actually released in slightly different ones. The standard 7" mix came in a thick paper sleeve, whereas the "secret" one came in a thin paper sleeve.

B-sides
All releases featured an edited version of "Get It On", originally recorded for a BBC Radio 1 session in 1983 (a full-length version was included on the cassette release), plus a faded or full length version of "Happy Hi!", a non-album track.

Both "Relax (International)" and "Born To Run" are live recordings (with some minor overdubs), based on an actual live appearance on The Tube's "Europe A-Go-Go" in Newcastle during early January 1985.

Music video
The music video for "Welcome to the Pleasuredome" was directed by Bernard Rose. It features the group stealing a car whilst Holly is flying in a helicopter chasing them, going to a carnival and encountering all manner of deceptively "pleasureable" activities. The audio soundtrack of the video was included as part of the cassette single.

Three edits were made, the regular 4:55 version with the regular 7" mix, a 5:45 version matching what was included on the cassette single and a 7:52 version with a longer, different intro.

Promotional releases
In 1984, a few months prior to the album's release, an early instrumental version of the album track was issued as a promotional 12-inch single, entitled "Welcome to the Pleasuredome (Pleasure Fix)", along with a similar early instrumental of "The Only Star in Heaven" (subtitled "Star Fix"). These tracks were subsequently given wider release as part of the B-side to the second 12-inch of "The Power of Love" single.

"Welcome to the Pleasuredome" was also used on several promotional records in the USA during 1985, featuring the following tracks in various combinations:
The second UK 7-inch mix of the track ("Alternative Reel"), labelled "Trevor Horn Re-mix Edit".
An edited version of the album track created by the Sacramento radio station KZAP, and known as "Welcome to the Pleasuredome (KZAP Edit)" (6:22)
A version of the second UK 7-inch mix ("Alternative Reel") with a new introduction added, and known as "Welcome to the Pleasuredome (Urban Mix)" (8:08).  This is on the Bang! Japanese album and CD, alongside the digital "Fruitness" single.
A slightly edited (spoken introduction removed) version of "Relax (International)" (4:26)

Charts

Weekly charts

Year-end charts

Track listing
 All discographical information pertains to the original UK single release only.
 All songs written by Peter Gill/Holly Johnson/Brian Nash/Mark O'Toole, unless otherwise noted.

7": ZTT / ZTAS 7 (UK)
 "Welcome to the Pleasuredome" (Altered Real) – 4:20
 "Get It On" (Marc Bolan) — 3:28
 "Happy Hi!" [fade] (Gill/Johnson/O'Toole) — 3:47
Matrix numbers on A-side: 1U/2U
"Get It On" has the third verse edited out, going from the second chorus to the fourth verse.
The "Altered Real" mix is also known as "Alternative To Reality".

7": ZTT / ZTAS 7 (UK)
 "Welcome to the Pleasuredome" (Alternative Reel) [a.k.a. Escape Act Video Mix or A Remade World] – 5:05
 "Get It On" – 3:28
 "Happy Hi!" – 4:04
Matrix numbers on A-side: 7U/8U
Also issued in Ireland and Canada.

7": ZTT / PZTAS 7 (UK)
 "Welcome to the Pleasuredome" (Alternative Reel) – 5:05
 "Get It On" – 2:32
 "Happy Hi!" – 4:04
Apple-shaped picture disc single
"Get It On" has the third and fourth verses edited out, going from the second verse to the fourth chorus.

7": Island / 7-99653 (US)
 "Welcome to the Pleasuredome" (Trevor Horn Remix) – 4:20
 "Relax" (International Live) – 4:26
A-side is actually the "Altered Real" mix.

7": Island / 107 199 EP (Germany)
 "Welcome to the Pleasuredome" (Altered Real) - 4:22
 "Get It On" – 2:32
 "Happy Hi!" – 4:04
"Get It On" has the third and fourth verses edited out, going from the second verse to the fourth chorus. Also issued in Australia without "Get It On".

12": ZTT / 12 ZTAS 7 (UK)
 "Welcome to the Pleasuredome" (Real Altered) – 9:42
 "Get It On" – 3:28
 "Happy Hi!" – 4:04
 "Relax" (International) (Gill/Johnson/O'Toole) — 4:51
"Get It On" is the same as the UK 7" edit. 
"Relax" (International) was rereleased in 2012 on CD Sexmix Disk 1, Track 6 in a very slightly edited (first words of spoken introduction removed) version. 
"Welcome to the Pleasuredome" (Real Altered) also known as "Welcome to the Pleasuredome (How To Remake The World)".

12": ZTT / 12 XZTAS 7 (UK)

 A  'Fruitness'
 "Welcome to the Pleasuredome" (Fruitness) – 12:15
 B  'Fruitness and light'
 "Get It On" – 2:32
 "Happy Hi!" – 4:04
 "Born to Run" ("live") – 4:49
"Fruitness" (usually portrayed without the 1:25 outro) is commonly referred as "The Alternative" by fans. 
"Born to Run" was recorded live in Newcastle in January 1985 on the "Europe A Go Go" tour. On other releases this version is labelled as "Born to Run (Live on the tube)"

12": Island / 0-96889 (US)
 "Welcome to the Pleasuredome" (Trevor Horn Remix) - 9:47
 "Get It On" - 2:32
 "Happy Hi!" - 4:02
 "Relax" (International/Live) - 4:51
A-side is actually the "Real Altered" mix. Also issued in Germany, and in Australia without "Get It On".

MC: ZTT / CTIS 107 (UK)
 "Happy Hi!" (All in the Body) – 1:18
 "Welcome To The Pleasuredome" (The Soundtrack from Bernard Rose's Video)" – 5:37
 "Get It On" – 4:06
 "Welcome to the Pleasuredome" (Real Altered) – 9:23
 "Happy Hi!" (All in the Mind) – 1:05
"Real Altered" plays at a slightly faster speed here. A 11:40 version of the regular "Real Altered" appears on the digital release and Sexmix. 
This complete cassette was slightly edited rereleased in 2012 on CD Sexmix Disk 1, Tracks 1–5. By mistake, the rerelease was originally printed in Monaural and was corrected via a mail-in replacement campaign.

Reissues
The track has periodically been reissued as a single, including during 1993 and 2000. Although these releases have some admirers, and have usefully made available various original mixes on CD for the first time, the accompanying A-side remixes by contemporary DJs have tended on the whole to bear little or no comparison to the spirit of the originals.

Reissues in the group's name have also tended to shun any overt reference to the identity of the original artists, and the reissue artwork has notably featured no images of the group. It has been suggested that this situation may relate to Johnson's successful but acrimonious court case against ZTT in 1989, which freed him (and effectively the other group members) from their unfair contract with the label.

1993 reissues

 CD: ZTT / FGTH2CD United Kingdom
 "Welcome To The Pleasuredome" (Original 7") – 4:22
 "Welcome To The Pleasuredome" (Brothers In Rhythm Rollercoaster Mix) – 14:36
 "Welcome To The Pleasuredome" (Elevatorman's Non-stop Top Floor Club Mix) – 6:06
 "Welcome To The Pleasuredome" (Pleasurefix Original 12" Mix) – 9:41

(Track 4 is mislabelled. It's the "Real Altered" version from 12 ZTAS 7.)

 12": ZTT / FGTH2T United Kingdom
 "Welcome To The Pleasuredome" (Brothers In Rhythm Rollercoaster Mix) – 14:36
 "Welcome To The Pleasuredome" (Elevatorman's Non-stop Top Floor Club Mix) – 6:06
 "Welcome To The Pleasuredome" (Elevatorman's Deep Down Bass-Ment Dub) – 6:02

2000 reissues

 CD: ZTT / ZTT 166CD United Kingdom
 "Welcome To The Pleasuredome" (Sleazesister Album Mix Edit) – 3:35
 "Welcome To The Pleasuredome" (Nalin & Kane Remix Edit) – 8:00
 "Welcome To The Pleasuredome" (Sleazesister Anthem Mix) – 7:32

 CD: Avex / AVTCDS-296 Japan

 "Welcome To The Pleasuredome" (Nalin & Kane Full Length Mix) – 11:23
 "Welcome To The Pleasuredome" (Sander's Coming Home Mix) – 10:18
 "Welcome To The Pleasuredome" (Paralyzer Remix) – 5:17
 "Welcome To The Pleasuredome" (Nalin & Kane Dub) – 11:22
 "Welcome To The Pleasuredome" (Sleazesister Edit) – 3:53
 "Welcome To The Pleasuredome" (Sleazesister Full Length Club) – 7:32
 "Welcome To The Pleasuredome" (Pleasurefix Mix) – 9:40

 12": ZTT / ZTT 166 T United Kingdom
 "Welcome To The Pleasuredome" (Nalin & Kane Remix) – 11:23
 "Welcome To The Pleasuredome" (Sander's Coming Home Remix) – 10:18

 2x12": ZTT / ZTT 166 TP United Kingdom
 "Welcome To The Pleasuredome" (Nalin & Kane Remix) – 11:23
 "Welcome To The Pleasuredome" (Sander's Coming Home Remix) – 10:18

 "Welcome To The Pleasuredome" (Paralyzer Remix) – 5:17
 "Welcome To The Pleasuredome" (Nalin & Kane Dub) – 11:22
 UK 2x12" promo

 12": ZTT / ZTT 166 TPX United Kingdom
 "Welcome To The Pleasuredome" (Sleazesisters Anthem Mix) – 7:32
 "Welcome To The Pleasuredome" (Paralyzer Remix) – 5:17
 "Welcome To The Pleasuredome" (Sleazesister Edit) – 3:53
 UK 12" promo

2014 reissues

 Digital download (regular)
 "Welcome To The Pleasuredome" (Altered Real) - 4:23
 "Welcome To The Pleasuredome" (Real Altered) - 9:40
 "Welcome To The Pleasuredome" (Alternative Reel) [reel misspelt as real] - 5:08
 "Get It On" (short version) - 2:36
 "Happy Hi!" - 4:06
 "Relax" (International) - 4:43

 Digital download (Fruitness)
 "Welcome To The Pleasuredome" (Fruitness) - 12:15
 "Welcome To The Pleasuredome" (Urban) - 8:05
 "Welcome To The Pleasuredome" (Pleasurefix) - 9:44
 "The Only Star in Heaven" (Starfix) - 3:54
 "Get It On" (short version) - 2:36
 "Happy Hi!" - 4:06
 "Born To Run" (International) - 4:54

Other versions
The instrumental "Into Battle Mix" appears on the soundtrack to the film Toys, specifically utilised whenever the Tommy Tanks appeared.

References

External links

1985 singles
Frankie Goes to Hollywood songs
Songs written by Holly Johnson
Song recordings produced by Trevor Horn
ZTT Records singles
1985 songs